Castello di Gamberale (Italian for Castle of Gamberale)  is a  Middle Ages castle in Gamberale, Province of Chieti (Abruzzo), Italy.

History

Architecture

References

Gamberale
Gamberale